The State Research Institute of Organic Chemistry and Technology (GosNIIOKhT)  is a Russian research institute engaged in the development of chemical technologies for use in the national economy and the production of relevant goods and products.

History 
GosNIIOKhT was founded in 1924, during the time of the Soviet Union, to conduct research work in organic synthesis and to be for the Soviet state the umbrella organization for it, below which were arrayed a number of satellite institutes.

From the early 1930s, the research institute was engaged in the development of chemical weapons. Significant numbers of scientists were also assigned to develop anti-crop and anti-animal agents.

GosNIIOKhT employed approximately 6,000 people by the dissolution of the Soviet Union. The employees worked in Novocheboksarsk on nerve agent production, in Volgograd on nerve agent production, in Dzerzinsk on blister agent production, in Shikhany on testing, and in Nukus, Uzbekistan on testing.

The Yeltsin government alarmed the international community by stating that it could not afford to keep the GosNIIOKhT facilities open or personnel employed, as that would mean starving scientists would have incentive to work for nefarious organizations.

By December 1999 the International Science and Technology Center had borne small fruit. In the opinion of one writer, "permitting the ISTC and the other grant programs to sponsor projects that work with Western commercial companies to retool some equipment and kick off the manufacturing of consumer products at these facilities. An advantage to lifting the congressional ban on defense conversion is that the Western commercial partners would have a frequent presence on site—an arrangement likely to foil efforts to produce warfare agents covertly at these facilities. Such an outcome
is far preferable to allowing the skilled labor at these facilities to become increasingly destitute and even desperate... Entire segments of poison gas experts have no contact with the [ISTC] grant programs, especially those within the design bureaus that have specialized skills in the aerosolization of agents and their weaponization."

Currently, its activities include the production of chemical weapons and other hazardous materials. Other areas of work include the development and production of drugs, toxicological research, preclinical testing, chemical technology, and environmental safety.

The Navalny affair
On October 15, 2020, European Union sanctions were imposed on the institute in connection with the poisoning of politician Alexei Navalny. The Council of the European Union's grounds for designation states

US sanctions
On 21 March 2021, invoking its authorities under the Countering America’s Adversaries Through Sanctions Act (CAATSA) Section 231, the United States Department of State added GosNIIOKhT to its List of Specified Persons as persons that are part of, or operate for or on behalf of, the defense or intelligence sectors of the Government of the Russian Federation. The Department describes GosNIIOKhT as "a Russian institute with a longstanding role in researching and developing chemical weapons, and GosNIIOKhT developed Russia’s Novichok chemical weapons.  Since 2016, GosNIIOKhT has expanded its research, development, testing, and evaluation capabilities."

References 

Soviet chemical weapons program
Novichok agents
Research institutes in the Soviet Union
Chemical research institutes
Research institutes established in 1924
1924 establishments in the Soviet Union